LPU may refer to:
 Least publishable unit, the smallest amount of information that can generate a publication in a peer-reviewed journal
 General Elections Institution (Lembaga Pemilihan Umum), former election organizer in Indonesia
 Linkin Park Underground, the fan club of an American rock band
 London and Provincial Union of Licensed Vehicle Workers, former British trade union
 Lovely Professional University, a university in Jalandhar, Punjab, India
 Lyceum of the Philippines University, a private and autonomous university in the Philippines.
 Local Processing Unit, used for PLC